

This is a list of the National Register of Historic Places listings in Saline County, Nebraska.  It is intended to be a complete list of the properties and districts on the National Register of Historic Places in Saline County, Nebraska, United States.  The locations of National Register properties and districts for which the latitude and longitude coordinates are included below, may be seen in a map.

There are 20 properties and districts listed on the National Register in the county.  Another site that was once listed on the Register has since been removed.

Current listings

|}

Former listing

|}

See also

 List of National Historic Landmarks in Nebraska
 National Register of Historic Places listings in Nebraska

References

Saline